Narayanpur is a village in Parsa block, Saran district of Bihar, India.  the 2011 Census of India, it had a population of 2,000 across 268 households.

References 

Villages in Saran district